Hesselbach is a town subdivision of Bad Laasphe in the Siegen-Wittgenstein district in North Rhine-Westphalia, Germany with 600 inhabitants.

Geography 
Hesselbach lies in southern Wittgenstein, 6 km in the south-east of Bad Laasphe and 2 km away of the Hessian border.

Literature 
 Jürgen Tang (ed.): 1150 Jahre Hesselbach - Eine Chronik. Bad Laasphe-Hesselbach, 1987
 Eckhard Linke and Werner Schmidt (ed.): Heimatbuch Banfetal, Bad Laasphe-Banfe 1987

References

Villages in North Rhine-Westphalia